George William Morgenthaler is an American mathematician at the University of Colorado at Boulder working on analysis.

External links

George W. Morgenthaler 

20th-century American mathematicians
21st-century American mathematicians
University of Colorado Boulder faculty
Living people
Year of birth missing (living people)
Place of birth missing (living people)